The Spotted Lily is a 1917 American silent drama film directed by Harry Solter and starring Ella Hall, Jack Nelson and George Beranger. Prints and/or fragments were found in the Dawson Film Find in 1978.

Cast
 Ella Hall as Yvonne
 Jack Nelson as Pere Anatole
 George Beranger as Captain Franz
 Victor Rodman as Jean 
 Gretchen Lederer as Sonia Maroff
 Charles Hill Mailes as Pere Anatole later
 Wilton Taylor as Angus Leeds
 Leon De La Mothe as Tony Cassati

References

Bibliography
 Paul C. Spehr & Gunnar Lundquist. American Film Personnel and Company Credits, 1908-1920. McFarland, 1996.

External links
 

1917 films
1917 drama films
1910s English-language films
American silent feature films
Silent American drama films
American black-and-white films
Universal Pictures films
Films directed by Harry Solter
1910s American films